Podlipki-Dachnye is a railway station of Yaroslavsky suburban railway line. It is located in the city of Korolyov of Moscow Oblast.

It takes 1 hour 20 minutes to get to the station from the Moscow Yaroslavsky railway station and 35 minutes from Fryazino station.

History 
The station was opened in 1914. It was named after the then-existing housing estate Villa-Podlipki. It was reconstructed and equipped with turnstiles in the beginning of the 2000s.

Public conveyances 
There are 3 bus routes that have the station as a terminus:
 12 — to station Bolshevo
 16 — to Lesnaya school
 15 — to the town of Yubileyny
Also buses of routes 1 and 2 (to Silikatnaya str.), 28 (to Mytishchi station) and 392 (to VDNKh Moscow Metro station) make a stop there.

References 

Railway stations of Moscow Railway
Railway stations in Moscow Oblast
Railway stations in the Russian Empire opened in 1914